Jake Ruby (born June 4, 2000) is a Canadian professional soccer player who plays as a full-back for the HFX Wanderers of the Canadian Premier League.

Early life
Ruby began playing youth soccer at age seven with Lynn Valley SA. Afterwards, he played for Mountain United FC, before joining the Vancouver Whitecaps Academy in 2016. In 2018, he participated in the first team's 2018 pre-season, as well as other first team training sessions. He departed the Whitecaps Academy in 2018, heading to Germany, where he had a month-long trial with 1. FC Nürnberg. He then began playing at the senior amateur level with NVFC Norvan in the Vancouver Metro Soccer League.

University career
In 2019, he began attending Trinity Western University, where he played for the men's soccer team. He scored his first goal on October 11, 2019 against the UFV Cascades. In his rookie season, he was named the TWU's Male Rookie of the Year, across all sports. He was also named a Canada West Second Team All-Star, as well as being named to the Canada West All-Rookie Team and the U SPORTS All-Rookie Team.

Club career
In April 2019, he signed with the Victoria Highlanders in USL League Two.

In November 2019, Ruby was selected 14th overall by HFX Wanderers in the 2019 CPL–U Sports Draft. In July 2020, he signed a U Sports contract with the Wanderers, which would allow him to maintain his university eligibility. In his debut season, he helped the Wanderers reach the CPL finals, where they were defeated by Forge FC. In February 2021, he returned to the Wanderers on a fully professional contract for 2021, with club options for an additional two seasons, planning to finish his post-secondary education in Halifax. He scored his first goal on August 7, 2021 against York United. In January 2022, the Wanderers picked up his option for the 2022 season. In January 2023, after having previously exercised his contract option for 2023, the club signed him to a new extension for the 2023 season, with options for 2024 and 2025.

International career
In October 2016, Ruby made his debut in the Canadian national program, participating in a Canadian under-17 team camp and a month later played in a friendly series with the team in Jamaica. He made his international debut on November 27, 2016 against Jamaica U17, earning man of the match honours. In May 2017, he was named to the roster for the 2017 CONCACAF U-17 Championship, where he started all three of the team's matches. In 2018, he was named to the Canada U21 team for the 2018 Toulon Tournament, but he was forced to withdraw due to injury.

Career statistics

References

External links

2000 births
Living people
Association football defenders
Canadian soccer players
Soccer players from Vancouver
Vancouver Whitecaps FC players
Trinity Western Spartans soccer players
Victoria Highlanders players
HFX Wanderers FC draft picks
HFX Wanderers FC players
USL League Two players
Canadian Premier League players
Canada men's youth international soccer players
Sportspeople from North Vancouver